Jerry Van Linge is an American former professional tennis player.

Van Linge, a native of Los Angeles, competed on the professional tour in the 1970s. He made the second round of the 1972 Golden Gate Pacific Coast Classic (Albany, California) and featured in doubles main draws at the US Open.

ATP Challenger finals

Doubles: 3 (1–2)

References

External links
 
 

Year of birth missing (living people)
Living people
American male tennis players
Tennis players from Los Angeles